The 1986 East Texas State Lions football team represented East Texas State University—now known as Texas A&M University–Commerce—as a member of the Lone Star Conference (LSC) during the 1986 NCAA Division II football season. Led by first-year head coach Eddie Vowell, the Lions compiled an overall record of 2–9 with a mark of 1–5 in conference play, placing sixth in the LSC. 1986 was only the second losing season for the program in 20 years. East Texas State played home games at Memorial Stadium in Commerce, Texas.

Schedule

Postseason awards

All-Americans
Mike Ciszewski, Honorable Mention Linebacker
Lawrence Motton, Honorable Mention Defensive Lineman

All-Lone Star Conference

LSC First Team
Mike Ciszewski, LB (1986)
Lawrence Motton, DL (1986)

LSC Second Team
Mark Kerr, Defensive Lineman
Aaron Muehlstein, Defensive Back
Allen Roulette, Offensive Tackle 
Vincent Stowers, Defensive Back

LSC Honorable Mention
Robert Giddens, Tight End
Dexter Harvey, Defensive End
Curtis Langston, Offensive Guard 
Dan Roberson, Punter
Stacy Williams, Defensive Back

References

East Texas State
Texas A&M–Commerce Lions football seasons
East Texas State Lions football